Sarmayeh Bank is a major Iranian banking establishment offering retail, commercial and investment banking services. The company was established in 2005 as a part of the government's privatization of the banking system.

Sarmayeh Bank is listed in Farabourse. In 2006, Sarmayeh Bank had an initial equity capital of $365.150 million.

Operations
The bank currently operated throughout the country, housing a total of 153 branches. In 2008, the Bank established several branches overseas in the Netherlands, United Arab Emirates and Tajikistan.

Sarmayeh Bank operates as a private bank in Iran; In addition to offering short and fixed deposit accounts for domestic and overseas clients, The bank also provides financial advisory, letters of credit, treasury, currency exchange, corporate loans syndication, and electronic banking services.

Shareholders
Sarmayeh Bank is currently the largest shareholder of the Bank. However, the bank currently has over 300,000 other shareholders.

Corporate governance
Alireza Heydarabadi Pour - President and CEO 2015–present

Current members of the board of directors include: Mohammadreza Khani, Bahman Khadem and Mohammad Zarepour Ashkzari.

See also

Banking in Iran
Privatization in Iran

References

External links
 

Banks of Iran
Banks established in 2000
Iranian companies established in 2000